The Mount Chenaillet (in French Mont Chenaillet or Le Chenaillet) is a 2,650 metres high mountain of the Cottian Alps, located on the Main chain of the Alps South of the Col de Montgenèvre.

Geography 

Administratively the mountain belongs to the French department of Hautes-Alpes close to the French-Italian border. On its summit the Susa Valley (tributary of the river Po) meets the valleys of the Durance (tributary of the Rhone) and of the Cerveyrette, the latter tributary of the Durance. The Main chain of the Alps connects northwards the Chenaillet to the Col de Montgenèvre, while towards NE it goes with the Monte Gimont. From the Chenaillet branches out from the main ridge a secondary chain dividing the valley of the Durance from the Cerveyrette one, which continues with the Sommet des Anges and the Sommet Château Jouan. Both the Durance and the Piccola Dora (an upper branch of Dora Riparia) have their sources on the slopes of the Chenaillet.

Geology 

The Chenaillet is a geological curiosity, being an ancient submarine volcano as old as 155 million years, which was uplifted to its present location during the Alpine orogeny. On the slopes of the Chenaillet are well distinguishable pillow lavas and ophiolite rocks. These features are explained on a geological foothpath reaching the summit of the mountain by some didactic panels both in French and in Italian.

History 
The mountain up to the end of the II World War was on the Franco-Italian border. Due to its prominent position overlooking the Col de Montgenèvre, from Louis XIV times until the ligne Maginot, the area was heavily fortified. On 23-6-1940 an Italian offensive conquered the mountain and also in 1944 it was the theater of heavy fights between German-Italian and French-Moroccan troops; and after many decades it is still possible to find howitzer chippings on the ground. After the end of the war, following the Paris Peace Treaties signed in February 1947, the border was modified and Mount Chenaillet is now totally in France.

Access to the summit 
The summit of the Chenaillet can be reached by footpath from several starting points. The way from the Col de Montgenèvre is considered quite an easy hike.

References

Maps
 French  official cartography (Institut géographique national - IGN); on-line version:  www.geoportail.fr

External links

 

Chenaillet
Chenaillet